The National COVID-19 Commission Advisory Board (NCC) is the Australian Government strategic advisory board for the national economic recovery to the COVID-19 pandemic. Originally formed as the National COVID-19 Coordination Commission on 25 March 2020, Prime Minister Scott Morrison described the body as responsible for advising the government on public–private partnerships and coordination to mitigate the social and economic impacts of the pandemic in Australia. On 22 July 2020, the commission was renamed the National COVID-19 Commission Advisory Board to better reflect the advisory, not executive, nature of the body.

Executive Board membership
Prime Minister Scott Morrison announced that membership of the Executive Board of the National COVID-19 Coordination Commission would consist of leaders from the private and public sectors.

The roles and membership were changed on 22 July 2020, with the commission becoming an advisory board. Entering into advisory roles were: Jane Halton, Paul Little, Catherine Tanna, David Thodey, Laura Berry, Samantha Hogg, Su McCluskey, Bao Hoang, Mike Hirst, and Paul Howes. In addition, the Secretary of the Department of the Prime Minister and Cabinet Philip Gaetjens, and Secretary of the Department of Home Affairs Mike Pezzullo, assist the board.

Greg Combet was an inaugural commissioner for the National COVID-19 Coordination Commission but departed the board in July 2020.

Secretariat
The Department of the Prime Minister and Cabinet provides secretariat support functions for the NCC.

See also
 Australian Health Protection Principal Committee
 Council of Australian Governments
 National Cabinet

References

Government agencies established in 2020
Government of Australia
Public policy in Australia
2020 in Australia
2020 establishments in Australia
COVID-19 pandemic in Australia